Cihan Yılmaz (born 15 June 1983) is a Turkish former professional footballer who played as a midfielder.

Club career 
Born in Turkey, Yılmaz began his career in Germany. He played for several German clubs, including SC Westfalia Herne, Rot Weiss Ahlen, SC Preußen Münster, Berlin AK 07, and SV Wehen Wiesbaden. He was signed by Karşıyaka in 2007, and later moved to Sivasspor in July 2009.

References 

1983 births
Living people
People from Erbaa
Turkish footballers
Association football midfielders
SC Westfalia Herne players
Rot Weiss Ahlen players
SC Preußen Münster players
Berliner AK 07 players
SV Wehen Wiesbaden players
Karşıyaka S.K. footballers
Sivasspor footballers
Boluspor footballers
Süper Lig players
2. Bundesliga players